Humphrey School District No. 7 was a school district operating public schools serving Humphrey, Arkansas. It was administratively divided into two schools: Humphrey Elementary School and Humphrey High School.

In the 2001–2002 school year the district had about 270 students on an average school day, with about 124 of them taking school bus transportation to their school.

On July 1, 2004, it, along with the Gillett School District, consolidated into the DeWitt School District.

References

Further reading
 Map of Arkansas School Districts pre-July 1, 2004
  (Download) - Includes the boundary of the Humphrey district

External links
 
 "Arkansas County, Arkansas Humphrey School District No. 7 Annual Financial Report Year Ended June 30, 2003." Arkansas Legislature.

Defunct school districts in Arkansas
School districts disestablished in 2004
2004 disestablishments in Arkansas
Education in Arkansas County, Arkansas
Education in Jefferson County, Arkansas